Forelius keiferi is a species of ant in the genus Forelius. Described by William Morton Wheeler in 1934, the species is endemic to Mexico.

References

Dolichoderinae
Hymenoptera of North America
Insects described in 1934